Nick Moon (born May 31, 1996) is an American soccer player who plays as a winger and fullback for San Diego Loyal in the USL Championship.

Career

Collegiate and Amateur Career 
Moon played college soccer at the University of Wisconsin–Milwaukee. He was a four-year starter with the team and made over 71 appearances for them. During his time with the Milwaukee Panthers he was one of the most dynamic offensive players in the Horizon League and was named to the All-Great Lakes Regional Teams. While in college, Moon also played for Lane United, a USL League Two team in Oregon. He played two seasons with the team and made 24 appearances, scoring 12 goals.

Professional career 
Moon signed his first professional contract with Lansing Ignite after impressing the team's coaching staff at one of their open tryouts. In his first season with the club he was considered one of USL League One's standout defensive players, while also maintaining an attacking threat. Leading into the league playoffs, Moon was one of the team's leaders in appearances.

In December 2019, Moon joined USL Championship side Indy Eleven.

Moon moved to USL Championship club San Diego Loyal on January 7, 2022.

References

External links 
 

1996 births
Living people
American soccer players
Association football forwards
Milwaukee Panthers men's soccer players
Fresno Fuego players
Lane United FC players
Lansing Ignite FC players
Indy Eleven players
San Diego Loyal SC players
Soccer players from Wisconsin
Sportspeople from Waukesha, Wisconsin
USL League One players
USL League Two players